Zoet is a Dutch surname.  Notable people with the surname include:

Bart Zoet (1942–1992), Dutch cyclist
Jeroen Zoet (born 1991), Dutch footballer
Jim Zoet (born 1953), Canadian basketball player who played in the National Basketball Association
Johannes Zoet (1908–1992), Dutch fencer

Dutch-language surnames
Surnames from nicknames